Alexis Hazael Gutiérrez Torres (born 26 February 2000) is a Mexican professional footballer who plays as a midfielder for Liga MX club Cruz Azul.

Club career
Gutiérrez joined Guadalajara's youth academy in 2012. He then joined Cruz Azul's youth academy. Under manager Pedro Caixinha, Gutiérrez made his professional debut in the Liga MX on the 28 of April 2019. He was subbed in a 4–1 win against Lobos BUAP.

Career statistics

Club

Honours
Cruz Azul
Liga MX: Guardianes 2021
Campeón de Campeones: 2021

Mexico U17
CONCACAF U-17 Championship: 2017

Individual
CONCACAF U-17 Championship Best XI: 2017

References

External links
 
 
 
 Alexis Gutiérrez at WhoScored

2000 births
Living people
Mexican footballers
Mexico under-20 international footballers
Liga MX players
C.D. Guadalajara footballers
Cruz Azul footballers
Association football midfielders
Footballers from Guanajuato
Sportspeople from León, Guanajuato
Mexico youth international footballers